Stow Creek Township is a township in Cumberland County, in the U.S. state of New Jersey. It is part of the Vineland-Bridgeton metropolitan statistical area for statistical purposes. As of the 2020 United States census, the township's population was 1,312, a decrease of 119 (−8.3%) from the 2010 census count of 1,431, which in turn reflected an increase of two people (+0.1%) from the 1,429 counted in the 2000 census.

It is a dry township, where alcohol is not permitted to be sold by law.

History
Stow Creek dates back to January 19, 1748, when it was formed as one of six precincts in the newly created Cumberland County. It was formally incorporated as a township on February 21, 1798.

As part of a political battle over the site of the county seat for Cumberland County, Columbia Township was formed on March 12, 1844, from portions of Hopewell and Stow Creek Townships; the short-lived municipality included all of present-day Shiloh, in addition to extensive additional land, but all was returned to its original home when Columbia Township was dissolved on March 11, 1845, surviving as an independent municipality for a day short of one year.

The spelling of the township's name was changed from "Stoe Creek" to "Stow Creek" on October 1, 1924.

On April 9, 1929, portions of the township were taken to create Shiloh. On October 1, 1924, the New Jersey Legislature officially changed the name of the township from "Stoe Creek" to "Stow Creek", though it is unclear when "Stow" had become "Stoe".

The township's name is shared with the Stow Creek, a tributary of the Delaware River.

Geography
According to the United States Census Bureau, the township had a total area of 18.89 square miles (48.93 km2), including 18.27 square miles (47.31 km2) of land and 0.63 square miles (1.62 km2) of water (3.32%).

Unincorporated communities, localities and place names located partially or completely within the township include Arrowhead Lake, Cumberland Causeway, Garrisons Corner, Gum Tree Corner, Jericho, Kernans Corner, Macanippock, Marlboro, Roadstown, Seventh Day Mill, Stow Creek Landing, Town Hall and Willis Corner.

The township borders the municipalities of Hopewell Township, Greenwich Township and Shiloh in Cumberland County; and Alloway Township, Lower Alloways Creek Township and Quinton Township in Salem County.

Demographics

2010 census

The Census Bureau's 2006–2010 American Community Survey showed that (in 2010 inflation-adjusted dollars) median household income was $71,333 (with a margin of error of +/− $7,849) and the median family income was $78,583 (+/− $7,836). Males had a median income of $52,500 (+/− $12,034) versus $38,036 (+/− $3,668) for females. The per capita income for the borough was $29,860 (+/− $3,146). About 4.1% of families and 6.8% of the population were below the poverty line, including 10.3% of those under age 18 and 4.3% of those age 65 or over.

2000 census
As of the 2000 United States census there were 1,429 people, 536 households, and 425 families residing in the township. The racial makeup of the township was 93.42% White, 3.50% African American, 1.61% Native American, 0.21% Asian, 0.84% from other races, and 0.42% from two or more races. Hispanic or Latino of any race were 1.68% of the population.

There were 536 households, out of which 32.1% had children under the age of 18 living with them, 69.0% were married couples living together, 6.7% had a female householder with no husband present, and 20.7% were non-families. 17.9% of all households were made up of individuals, and 7.5% had someone living alone who was 65 years of age or older.  The average household size was 2.67 and the average family size was 3.01.

In the township the population was spread out, with 23.5% under the age of 18, 7.2% from 18 to 24, 25.8% from 25 to 44, 29.0% from 45 to 64, and 14.5% who were 65 years of age or older. The median age was 41 years. For every 100 females, there were 96.8 males. For every 100 females age 18 and over, there were 92.8 males.

The median income for a household in the township was $52,500, and the median income for a family was $58,583. Males had a median income of $35,500 versus $26,528 for females. The per capita income for the township was $20,925. About 5.7% of families and 6.7% of the population were below the poverty line, including 8.1% of those under age 18 and 12.1% of those age 65 or over.

Government

Local government
Stow Creek is governed under the Township form of New Jersey municipal government, one of 141 municipalities (of the 564) statewide that use this form, the second-most commonly used form of government in the state. The governing body is comprised of a three-member Township Committee, whose members are elected directly by the voters at-large in partisan elections to serve three-year terms of office on a staggered basis, with one seat coming up for election each year as part of the November general election in a three-year cycle. At an annual reorganization meeting, the Township Committee selects one of its members to serve as Mayor.

, members of the Stow Creek Township Committee are Mayor Dale F. Cruzan Sr. (R, term on committee ends December 31, 2023; term as mayor ends 2022), Thomas R. Burton (R, 2022) and Dave Shivers (R, 2024).

Federal, state and county representation 
Stow Creek Township is located in the 2nd Congressional District and is part of New Jersey's 1st state legislative district. Prior to the 2011 reapportionment following the 2010 Census, Stow Creek Township had been in the 3rd state legislative district.

Politics
As of March 2011, there were a total of 979 registered voters in Stow Creek Township, of which 200 (20.4%) were registered as Democrats, 362 (37.0%) were registered as Republicans and 416 (42.5%) were registered as Unaffiliated. There was one voter registered to another party.

In the 2012 presidential election, Republican Mitt Romney received 64.9% of the vote (447 cast), ahead of Democrat Barack Obama with 34.5% (238 votes), and other candidates with 0.6% (4 votes), among the 697 ballots cast by the township's 982 registered voters (8 ballots were spoiled), for a turnout of 71.0%. In the 2008 presidential election, Republican John McCain received 58.5% of the vote (431 cast), ahead of Democrat Barack Obama, who received 38.4% (283 votes), with 737 ballots cast among the township's 979 registered voters, for a turnout of 75.3%. In the 2004 presidential election, Republican George W. Bush received 64.6% of the vote (455 ballots cast), outpolling Democrat John Kerry, who received around 34.4% (242 votes), with 704 ballots cast among the township's 915 registered voters, for a turnout percentage of 76.9.

In the 2013 gubernatorial election, Republican Chris Christie received 75.1% of the vote (355 cast), ahead of Democrat Barbara Buono with 24.1% (114 votes), and other candidates with 0.8% (4 votes), among the 483 ballots cast by the township's 942 registered voters (10 ballots were spoiled), for a turnout of 51.3%. In the 2009 gubernatorial election, Republican Chris Christie received 60.6% of the vote (308 ballots cast), ahead of both Democrat Jon Corzine with 29.1% (148 votes) and Independent Chris Daggett with 6.3% (32 votes), with 508 ballots cast among the township's 962 registered voters, yielding a 52.8% turnout.

Education 
The Stow Creek School District serves public school students in kindergarten through eighth grade at Stow Creek School. As of the 2020–21 school year, the district, comprised of one school, had an enrollment of 125 students and 25.4 classroom teachers (on an FTE basis), for a student–teacher ratio of 4.9:1. In the 2016-17 school year, it had the 13th-smallest enrollment of any school district in the state. Under the Greenwich - Stow Creek Partnership established in 2009 with the Greenwich Township School District in Greenwich Township, students from both townships attend Morris Goodwin School for grades K-4 and Stow Creek School for grades 5-8.

Public school students in ninth through twelfth grades attend Cumberland Regional High School, which also serves students from Deerfield Township, Fairfield Township, Greenwich Township, Hopewell Township, Shiloh Borough and Upper Deerfield Township. As of the 2020–21 school year, the high school had an enrollment of 1,032 students and 78.5 classroom teachers (on an FTE basis), for a student–teacher ratio of 13.1:1. The high school district has a nine-member board of education, with board seats allocated to the constituent municipalities based on population, with each municipality assigned a minimum of one seat; Stow Creek Township has one seat on the board.

Students are also eligible to attend Cumberland County Technology Education Center in Vineland, serving students from the entire county in its full-time technical training programs, which are offered without charge to students who are county residents.

Transportation

New Jersey Route 49 is the main highway providing access to Stow Creek.

References

External links

Township website
Greenwich Stow Creek Partnership Schools

School Data for the Stow Creek School, National Center for Education Statistics
Cumberland Regional High School

 
1748 establishments in New Jersey
Populated places established in 1748
Township form of New Jersey government
Townships in Cumberland County, New Jersey